The 14th Air Defence Artillery Regiment is an air defence artillery regiment in the Land Component of the Belgian Armed Forces. It is the successor of the 14th Regiment of Artillery.

Organisation
The 14th Air Defence Regiment comprises two Mistral batteries, the 43rd Battery and the 35th Battery, which each consist of three platoons. In turn, each platoon consists of six Mistral groups, which means that there are 36 Mistral groups in the regiment.

External links
Section of the website of the Belgian Ministry of Defence about the 14th Air Defence Artillery Regiment - Only available in Dutch and French

Air Defence